Pierre Mosca (born Pietro Mosca; 24 July 1949) is French former football player and coach who played as a defender for Montpellier and Monaco.

After his playing career, he became a coach with Sochaux, Rennes, Montpellier, Toulouse, Toulon, Nîmes and Aiglon du Lamentin.

References

External links
Profile

1945 births
Living people
Italian emigrants to France
French footballers
Association football defenders
Montpellier HSC players
AS Monaco FC players
Ligue 1 players
Ligue 2 players
French football managers
FC Sochaux-Montbéliard managers
Stade Rennais F.C. managers
Montpellier HSC managers
Toulouse FC managers
SC Toulon managers
Nîmes Olympique managers
Ligue 1 managers
INF Vichy managers
People from Demonte
Footballers from Piedmont
Sportspeople from the Province of Cuneo
Sportspeople from Gard
Footballers from Occitania (administrative region)